Treva Silverman (born May 20, 1936) is an American screenwriter.

Career
Silverman is best known for her work on the 1970s sitcom The Mary Tyler Moore Show. 

In the 1960s and 1970s, Silverman also wrote scripts for That Girl, The Monkees, He & She, Room 222 and The Bill Cosby Show.

Awards
 1974: Emmy Awards, Outstanding Writing for a Comedy Series for The Mary Tyler Moore, "The Lou and Edie Story"
 1974: Emmy Awards, Writer of the Year - Series for The Mary Tyler Moore, "The Lou and Edie Story"

Filmography
 1964: The Entertainers (TV series) – writer
 1967: NBC Experiment in Television (TV series) – writer (episode: "We Interrupt This Season")
 1967: That Girl (TV series) – writer
 1967: Captain Nice (TV series) – writer
 1966-1967: The Monkees (TV series) – writer
 1967: Accidental Family (TV series) – writer (episode: "A Funny Thing Happened on the Way to the Playground")
 1968: He & She (TV series) – writer (episode: "A Rock by Any Other Name")
 1968: The Dean Martin Show (TV series) – writer
 1969: Room 222 (TV series) – writer
 1970: Lancelot Link, Secret Chimp (TV series) – writer
 1970: The Many Moods of Perry Como (TV series) – writer
 1971: The Bill Cosby Show (TV series) – writer
 1972: Oh, Nurse (TV movie) – writer
 1970-1974: The Mary Tyler Moore Show  (TV series) – writer, executive story consultant
 1977: Vanities (TV movie) – writer
 1984: Romancing the Stone – writer
 1990: The Fanelli Boys (TV series) – producer, writer
 1994: De Sylvia Millecam Show (TV series) – writer

References

External links

 
 Meet Treva Silverman
 Written by Treva Silverman

American screenwriters
Emmy Award winners
Living people
Place of birth missing (living people)
1936 births